, originally , was a Japanese semi-legendary prince of the Yamato dynasty, son of Emperor Keikō, who is traditionally counted as the 12th Emperor of Japan. His name written in kanji can vary, in the Nihon Shoki it is spelled 日本武尊 and in the Kojiki it is 倭建命. He was also the predecessor of Takeda ryu.

One of his sons became Emperor Chūai, the 14th Emperor of Japan.

His history is uncertain but based on the chronicles his life can be calculated. He was born circa 72 and died in 114. Details are different between the two books, and the version in Kojiki is assumed to be loyal to the older form of this legend.

Legendary narrative

Prince Takeru slew his elder brother . His father, the emperor Keikō, feared his brutal temperament. To keep him at a distance, the father sent him to Izumo Province, today the eastern part of Shimane Prefecture, and then the land of Kumaso, today Kumamoto Prefecture. However, Takeru succeeded in defeating his enemies, in the latter case by cross-dressing as a maid attendant at a drinking party. One of the enemies he defeated praised him and gave him the title Yamato Takeru, meaning The Brave of Yamato. But Emperor Keikō's mind was unchanged.

Keikō sent Yamato Takeru to the eastern land whose people disobeyed the imperial court. Yamato Takeru met his aunt Princess Yamato-hime, the highest priestess of Amaterasu at Ise Grand Shrine (in Ise Province) and grieved, "my father wishes I would die?" Princess Yamatohime-no-mikoto showed him compassion and lent him a holy sword named Ame no Murakumo no tsurugi (Kusanagi no tsurugi), which Susanoo, the brother god of Amaterasu, found in the body of the eight-headed great serpent, Yamata no Orochi. Yamato Takeru went to the eastern land. He lost his wife Oto tachibana-hime during a storm when she sacrificed herself to soothe the anger of the sea god. He defeated many enemies in the eastern land, and legend has it that he and a local old man composed the first sedōka in Kai Province with Mount Tsukuba (now in Ibaraki Prefecture) as its theme. On his return he blasphemed a local god of Mount Ibuki, which sits on the border of Ōmi Province and Mino Province. The god cursed him with disease and he fell ill.

The story above is found in the Kojiki. In the Nihonshoki version, the father and Yamato Takeru keep a good relation.

According to traditional sources, Yamato Takeru died in the 43rd year of Emperor Keiko's reign (景行天皇43年). The possessions of the dead prince were gathered together along with the sword Kusanagi; and his widow venerated his memory in a shrine at her home. Some time later, these relics, including the sacred sword were moved to the current location of Atsuta Shrine.

Yamato Takeru is believed to have died somewhere in Ise Province. According to the legend, the name of Mie Prefecture was derived from his final words. After death, his soul turned into a great white bird and flew away. His tomb in Ise is known as the Mausoleum of the White Plover. A statue of Yamato Takeru stands in Kenroku-en in Kanazawa, Ishikawa.

Comparative legends 
Anthropologist C. Scott Littleton has described the Yamato Takeru legend as "Arthurian" due to some structural similarities with the King Arthur legend. Common points include the use of two magic swords, of which the first validates the authority of the hero; the leadership role of a war band; the death to an enemy after giving up the sword to a female figure; a transportation to the after world; and others. Littleton proposed that both legends descend from a common northeast Iranian ancestor.

In popular culture

Age of Empires I, in campaign for Yamato civilization, Assassin take inspiration telling of "Perseus" (Takeru) attempt eliminates Izumo leader.
One of the feats of Yamato Takeru was recounted in the "Grasscutter" volume of Stan Sakai's graphic novel series, Usagi Yojimbo, as well as the legend of how Kusanagi-no-Tsurugi was transferred to the Atsuta Shrine.
The second book of Noriko Ogiwara's The Jade Trilogy, Mirror Sword and Shadow Prince, is a retelling of Yamato Takeru's legend. The novel follows Oguna, a.k.a. Prince Ousu, one of the two main protagonists.
Yamato Takeru is seen in a dream in the epilogue to "The Golden Princess", one of the Novels of the Change. The sword itself is the major plot point.
In the Digimon Adventure series, two of the main characters are brothers, and their names are a reference to Yamato Takeru: Yamato Ishida and Takeru Takaishi.
In the infamous OVA Garzey's Wing, the protagonist suspects the involvement of Yamato Takeru in various supernatural events, causing him to awkwardly and inexplicably invoke the full name "Yamato Takeru no Mikoto" from time to time. This is especially confusing to western viewers as Yamato Takeru does not appear in the plot.
Yamato Takeru is a boss within the video game Shin Megami Tensei IV, fought within the Chaos route of the game. In the Law route, he is discovered at death's doorstep, and dies soon after.
Yamato Takeru also appears in Persona 4 and its enhanced remake, Persona 4 Golden. There, Yamato Takeru functions as the evolved form of the initial Persona of the final teammate, Naoto Shirogane, replacing Sukuna-Hinoka.

See also
Yamato Takeru (TV series)
Yamato Takeru (film)

Notes

References
Morris, Ivan, The Nobility of Failure: Tragic Heroes in the History of Japan, Secker & Warburg, London, 1975 (p. 1-14, Chapter 1 Yamato Takeru)
Ponsonby-Fane, Richard Arthur Brabazon. (1953).  Studies in Shinto and Shrines. Kyoto: Ponsonby Memorial Society. OCLC 470294859
Littleton, C.S. Some Possible Arthurian Themes in Japanese Mythology and Folklore. 1983.
Littleton, C.S. Yamato-takeru: An "Arthurian" Hero in Japanese Tradition. 1995.

External links

Bank of Japan 1000 yen note 1945 prince Yamato Takeru

Japanese princes
People of Yayoi-period Japan
Deified Japanese people
War gods
Sons of emperors
Deified Japanese people in the Kiki